aka A Slope in the Sun is a 1958 black-and-white Japanese film drama directed by Tomotaka Tasaka.

The film is based on the novel by Yōjirō Ishizaka.

The film won 1959 Blue Ribbon Awards for best director and also won 1959 Mainichi Film Concours for best cinematography.

Cast 
 Yujiro Ishihara as Shinji Tashiro
 Mie Kitahara as Takako
 Koreya Senda as Tamakichi Tashiro
 Yukiko Todoroki as Midori Tashiro
 Izumi Ashikawa as Kumiko Tashiro
 Tamio Kawachi as Tamio Takagi
 Isamu Kosugi as Shiosawa

References

External links 

Japanese black-and-white films
1958 films
Films directed by Tomotaka Tasaka
Nikkatsu films
Films scored by Masaru Sato
1950s Japanese films